The 2018 International Crown was a women's golf team event organized by the LPGA, played 4–7 Oct at the Jack Nicklaus Golf Club Korea in Incheon, South Korea. This was the third International Crown, a biennial match play event contested between teams of four players representing eight countries.

Due to the anticipated arrival of Typhoon Kong-rey, the tournament schedule was adjusted; the second round tee times were moved earlier on Friday and the third round, originally scheduled for Saturday, was started on Friday afternoon. The final round was to be played Saturday, 6 October, instead of Sunday. However, typhoon rains arrived earlier than expected so that no matches were played Saturday; the third round was finished Sunday, followed by the singles matches.

Format
The first three rounds featured round-robin pool play matches at fourball. Each match was worth two points for a win and one point for a halve. Following the completion of pool play, the top two teams in each pool and one wild card team advanced to singles play.

These five remaining teams were re-seeded based on points earned in pool play. The players then competed in singles play on Sunday, with the four members of one team each paired up with a member of a different one of the other four teams.  The total points earned in pool and singles play determined the team champion.

Teams
On 3 June 2018, eight teams qualified to participate in this event, based on the combined world rankings of the top four players from each country: South Korea, United States, Japan, England, Australia, Thailand, Sweden, and Chinese Taipei. The field was the same as 2016 with the exception of Sweden replacing China. The team members were finalized on 2 July 2018, and the teams were divided into two pools.

Rankings as of 2 July 2018

Notes: 
for South Korea, Inbee Park (ranked 1) declined to play and the first two alternates Choi Hye-jin (11) and Ko Jin-young (17) also declined to play
for Japan, Ayako Uehara replace an injured Ai Suzuki

Results

Round one pool play
Thursday, 4 October 2018

Pool A
South Korea vs. Chinese Taipei
Match 7: Park/Kim (KOR) defeated Kung/Yao (TPE), 1 up
Match 8: Chun/Ryu (KOR) defeated Lu/Hsu (TPE), 2 up
England vs. Australia
Match 1: Hull/Hall (ENG) and Lee/Smith (AUS), halved
Match 2: Law/Ewart Shadoff (ENG) defeated Kirk/Oh (AUS), 4 & 3

Standings after round one

Pool B
United States vs. Sweden
Match 5: Kerr/Thompson (USA) defeated Lindberg/Sagström (SWE), 2 up
Match 6: Nordqvist/Hedwall (SWE) defeated Korda/Wie (USA), 2 up
Japan vs. Thailand
Match 3: Hataoka/Uehara (JPN) and M Jutanugarn/Phatlum (THA), halved
Match 4: A Jutanugarn/Santiwiwatthanaphong (THA) defeated Narita/Higa (JPN), 2 & 1

Standings after round one

Source:

Round two pool play
Friday, 5 October 2018

Pool A
South Korea vs. Australia
Match 15: Ryu/Chun (KOR) defeated Lee/Smith (AUS), 2 & 1
Match 16: Oh/Kirk (AUS) defeated Park/Kim (KOR), 3 & 2
England vs. Chinese Taipei
Match 13: Hull/Hall (ENG) defeated Hsu/Lu (TPE), 2 & 1
Match 14: Law/Ewart Shadoff (ENG) defeated Kung/Yao (TPE), 6 & 4

Standings after round two

Pool B
Japan vs. Sweden
Match 9: Nordqvist/Hedwall (SWE) defeated Narita/Higa (JPN), 6 & 4
Match 10: Uehara/Hataoka (JPN) defeated Lindberg/Sagström (SWE), 4 & 3
United States vs. Thailand
Match 11: Korda/Wie (USA) defeated M Jutanugarn/Phatlum (THA), 6 & 4
Match 12: Kerr/Thompson (USA) defeated A Jutanugarn/Santiwiwatthanaphong (THA), 4 & 3

Standings after round two

Source:

Round three pool play
Friday, 5 October 2018
Sunday, 7 October 2018

Pool A
South Korea vs. England
Match 23: Park/Kim (KOR) defeated Hull/Hall (ENG), 4 & 2
Match 24: Chun/Ryu (KOR) defeated Ewart Shadoff/Law (ENG), 4 & 3
Australia vs. Chinese Taipei
Match 21: Lee/Smith (AUS) defeated Kung/Lu (TPE), 2 up
Match 22: Oh/Kirk (AUS) defeated Hsu/Yao (TPE), 5 & 4
 
Standings after round three

Pool B
United States vs. Japan
Match 19: Hataoka/Uehara (JPN) defeated Korda/Wie (USA), 2 & 1
Match 20: Kerr/Thompson (USA) defeated Narita/Higa (JPN), 4 & 3
Thailand vs. Sweden
Match 17: M Jutanugarn/A Jutanugarn (THA) defeated Nordqvist/Hedwall (SWE), 2 & 1
Match 18: Lindberg/Sagström (SWE) defeated Phatlum/Santiwiwatthanaphong (THA), 2 & 1

Standings after round three

Wild card
Australia, Japan, and Thailand advanced to the wildcard playoff by finishing third in their pools. Thailand advanced.
 
Standings after four ball matches

Source:

Singles play
Sunday, 7 October 2018

Match 25: Hedwall (SWE) and Santiwiwatthanaphong (THA), halved
Match 26: Hull (ENG) defeated Phatlum (THA), 1 up
Match 27: Lindberg (SWE) defeated Shadoff (ENG), 1 up
Match 28: M Jutanugarn (THA) defeated Wie (USA), 2 & 1
Match 29: A Jutanugarn (THA) defeated Park (KOR), 2 & 1
Match 30: Korda (USA) defeated Sagstrom (SWE), 4 & 3
Match 31: Chun (KOR) defeated Nordqvist (SWE), 1 up
Match 32: Hall (ENG) defeated Kerr (USA), 2 & 1
Match 33: Kim (KOR) defeated Law (ENG), 2 up
Match 34: Ryu (KOR) and Thompson (USA), halved
Source:

Final standings

References

External links

International Crown
Golf tournaments in South Korea
International Crown
International Crown
International Crown